Brady L Blade Jr. (born 1965 in Shreveport, Louisiana) is an American rock, pop and country drummer, record producer and composer, who currently resides in Stockholm, Sweden.

He is the son of Dorothy and Pastor Brady Blade Sr. (Pastor of the Zion Baptist Church in Shreveport, Louisiana). His brother is jazz drummer Brian Blade.

Having learned to play drums in both high school and as part of his father's church, Brady initially sought out a career in business, focusing on the music industry.  This led to A&R roles at several major record labels, before ultimately becoming manager to the Brand New Heavies. He has played as part of Emmylou Harris's band, Spyboy, Steve Earle and the Dukes, Dave Matthews & Friends, and with Buddy & Julie Miller.

Return to drumming
Early 1995 saw Emmylou Harris persuade Brady to return to his kit as part of her touring band Spyboy, along with Daniel Lanois and Darryl Johnson.  The following year they were joined by Buddy Miller and toured throughout the mid-nineties, culminating in a live album Spyboy, released in 1998.

Touring the world with Emmylou Harris led Brady to encounter and be seen by some of the key figures in the American music scene which resulted in Brady becoming one of the most in-demand session drummers around.  Brady took part in extensive tours and sessions with the Steve Earle during his El Corazón period; Jewel throughout her 1998 Spirit world tour; and the Indigo Girls on their 1999 album Come on Now Social, 2002's Become You, 2004's All That We Let In, and 2011's Beauty Queen Sister.

Dave Matthews & Friends
A chance meeting with Dave Matthews whilst on tour with Emmylou Harris eventually led to Brady being invited to form the nucleus of Matthew's jam band project Dave Matthews & Friends, bringing bassist Tony Hall into the project.  The group went on to record and release the album Some Devil, and toured extensively across the USA.  The group reformed after a period of hiatus to headline the 2004 Bonnaroo Music Festival in Manchester, Tennessee and the 2005 Vegoose music festival.

Current activities
In recent years, Brady has expanded his work to include production and writing.  His work has largely been focused on working with new acts, developing their song-writing and ultimately producing and recording  with them.  He has had a number of major successes, particularly in Australia and New Zealand, where his work has featured prominently in their national music charts, producing the debut records of both Brooke Fraser and Annabel Fay and Annah Mac.

Throughout 2006 Brady toured with Scottish singer Freddie Stevenson across the USA and Europe, as well as featuring on the most recent Solomon Burke record Nashville, and on the latest Waterboys record Book of Lightning.

Brady announced that he will be touring Taiwan and China, conducting drum clinics and seminars in conjunction with Mapex Drums and Avedis Zildjian Company, throughout May and June.

In early 2013, Brady gathered several musicians, including Jakob Dylan, Dave Matthews, Charlie Sexton, and Sexton's brother Will, to his studio in Shreveport to record.  This jam session eventually led to the formation of a band called The Nauts with Blade, Dylan, Matthews, and the Sexton brothers as members.  They are currently working on their debut album.

In summer 2014, Brady appeared on Late Show with David Letterman as a drummer, performing alongside artist John Doe.

Business ventures
In 2005 Brady founded record label Brick Top Recordings LLC. Early signings included Swedish rock bands Tony Clifton and Froid.

In 2009 Brady Started Blade Studios in Shreveport Louisiana with partner Scott Crompton and mix engineer Chris Bell

Discography
 Brother Sister - Brand New Heavies (1994)
 Doyle Bramhall II - Doyle Bramhall (1995)
 El Corazón - Steve Earle (1997)
 Poison Love - Buddy Miller (1997)
 Terra Incognita - Chris Whitley (1997)
 Burning The Daze - Marc Cohn (1998)
 OST - The Horse Whisperer (1998)
 N'Dea Davenport - N'Dea Davenport (1998)
 No Mermaid - Sinéad Lohan (1998)
 Spyboy - Emmylou Harris (1998)
 Sun Machine - Morley (1998)
 Broken Things - Julie Miller (1999)
 Come on Now Social - Indigo Girls (1999)
 It's About Time - Bobby Whitlock (1999)
 "Jupiter (Swallow the Moon)" - Jewel (1999)
 Big Slow Mover - Phil Cody (2001)
 Buddy & Julie Miller - Buddy & Julie Miller (2001)
 Become You - Indigo Girls (2002)
 Immigrant Flower - Siobhan Maher Kennedy (2002)
 Midnight and Lonesome - Buddy Miller (2002)
 Sidetracks - Steve Earle (2002)
 Too Much Is Always Better Than Not Enough - Diamond Dogs (2002)
 Leave the Light On - Beth Hart (2003)
 Nothing Comes Free - Brigitte DeMeyer (2003)
 Shine - Daniel Lanois (2003)
 Some Devil - Dave Matthews (2003)
 Stumble into Grace - Emmylou Harris (2003)
 All That We Let In - Indigo Girls (2004)
 You are here - Opshop (2004)
 Communicate! - The Solution (2004)
 Clarence Greenwood Recordings - Citizen Cope (2004)
 Impossible Dream - Patty Griffin (2004)
 Love Snuck Up - Buddy & Julie Miller (2004)
 Universal United House of Prayer - Buddy Miller (2004)
 Ship Called Love - Eric Bibb (2005)
 Body on the Line - Freddie Stevenson (2005)
 Annabel Fay - Annabel Fay (2006)
 Nashville - Solomon Burke (2006)
 All My Strange Companions - Freddie Stevenson (2007)
 "Red River Flower - Brigitte De Meyer (2009)
 Age of the Underdog - Stephen Speaks (2011)
 "Alive by Sunrise" - Alive by Sunrise (2011)

References

External links
Brady Blade Interview NAMM Oral History Library (2004)

1965 births
Living people
Musicians from Shreveport, Louisiana
American rock drummers
Indigo Girls members
20th-century American drummers
American male drummers